Sultan bin Fahd Al Saud  (born 1951) is a member of House of Saud. Graduated from Sandhurst Military Academy Prince Sultan is the former president of Youth Welfare agency which he held between 1999 and 2011.

Early life and education
Prince Sultan was born in Taif in 1951. He is the son of King Fahd. His mother, Alanoud bint Abdulaziz bin Musaed, was from the Jiluwi branch of the Al Saud whose members intermarried with the Al Saud. Alanoud bint Abdulaziz was younger sister of Moneera, who was the spouse of Prince Sultan, and she was also cousin of King Khalid and Prince Muhammed. She died of kidney failure in Santa Barbara in March 1999 after a long period of treatment in Los Angeles at the age of 76.

Prince Sultan's full-brothers are Faisal bin Fahd, Mohammad bin Fahd, Saud bin Fahd, Khaled bin Fahd, and his full-sister is Latifa bint Fahd. He attended Sandhurst Military Academy and obtained a bachelor's degree in military sciences in 1973.

Career
Prince Sultan joined the tank corps of the Saudi Arabian armed forces as a lieutenant at Tabuk Province after his graduation. In 1991, he was appointed deputy president of youth welfare. He was named as the president of the body on 1 September 1999 following the death of his brother Faisal bin Fahd. Prince Sultan resigned from office in January 2011. His nephew, Nawaf bin Faisal, replaced him as the head of youth welfare. Prince Sultan was the chairman of Saudi Arabian olympic committee.

Prince Sultan has several business activities. He has shares in various companies, including Falcom and Tok Al Khaleej Investment. He is a board member of Al Anoud Foundation.

Personal life
Sultan bin Fahd is married to Al Jawhara bint Faisal bin Turki Al Saud, a daughter of his full aunt, Luluwah bint Abdulaziz. They have two daughters, Nouf and Sara.

Ancestry

References

External links

Sultan
Sultan
Sultan
Sultan
1951 births
Children of Fahd of Saudi Arabia
Sultan
Graduates of the Royal Military Academy Sandhurst
Living people
Sultan
Sultan